Hiempsal I (died c. 117 BC), son of Micipsa and grandson of Masinissa, was a king of Numidia in the late 2nd century BC.

Micipsa, on his deathbed, left his two sons, Adherbal and Hiempsal, together with his cousin, Jugurtha, joint heirs of his kingdom.  Sallust claims the arrangement fell apart almost immediately due to the unprincipled ambition of Jugurtha and the longtime jealousy of his two half-brothers. At the very first meeting of the three princes their animosity displayed broke into the open.  Hiempsal, the younger and most impetuous of the two brothers, gave mortal offence to Jugurtha.  After this interview, it being agreed to divide the kingdom of Numidia, as well as the treasures of the late king, between the three princes, they took up their quarters in different towns in the neighborhood of Cirta. But as Hiempsal had imprudently established himself at Thirmida, in a house belonging to a dependant of Jugurtha, the latter took advantage of this circumstance to introduce a body of armed men into the house during the night, who put to death the unhappy prince, together with many of his followers.  

Livy, on the other hand, appears, so far as we can judge from the words of his Epitomist, to represent the death of Hiempsal as the result of open hostilities.  Orosius, who probably followed Livy, says only Hiempsalem occidit.

References

2nd-century BC rulers in Africa
2nd-century BC Berber people
Kings of Numidia